Listed here are notable groups and populations from South Asia by human mitochondrial DNA haplogroups based on relevant studies. The samples are taken from individuals identified with linguistic designations (IE=Indo-European, Dr=Dravidian, AA=Austro-Asiatic and ST=Sino-Tibetan), the third column gives the sample size studied, and the other columns give the percentage of the particular haplogroup. The two most widespread MtDNA haplogroups in South Asia are Haplogroup M (of South Asian origin) and Haplogroup U (West Eurasian).

Note: The converted frequencies from some old studies conducted in the first decade of the 21st century may lead to unsubstantial frequencies below.

U* = other derivatives of haplogroup U; R* = derivatives of haplogroup R that do not belong to HV, TJ, U, B, and F.

References

Human genetic history
Human mitochondrial genetics
Human mtDNA haplogroups